The 2013–14 Miami Hurricanes men's basketball team represented the University of Miami during the 2013–14 NCAA Division I men's basketball season. The Hurricanes, led by third year head coach Jim Larrañaga, played their home games at the BankUnited Center and were members of the Atlantic Coast Conference. They finished the season 17–16, 7–11 in ACC play to finish in tenth place. They advanced to the second round of the ACC tournament where they lost to NC State.

Offseason

Departures

Incoming transfers

2013 recruiting class

Roster

Schedule and results

|-
!colspan=12 style=| Exhibition

|-
!colspan=12 style=| Regular season

|-
!colspan=12 style=| ACC tournament

References

Miami Hurricanes men's basketball seasons
Miami Hurricanes
Miami Hurricanes men's basketball team
Miami Hurricanes men's basketball team